Narciso González Rossano (born 29 October 1971) is a Mexican boxer. He competed in the men's flyweight event at the 1992 Summer Olympics.

In 2019, he was named the head coach of the Mexican national amateur boxing team.

His son, Brian Alexis González, is also a boxer and trains under him.

References

External links
 
 

1971 births
Living people
Flyweight boxers
Mexican male boxers
Mexican boxing trainers
Olympic boxers of Mexico
Boxers at the 1992 Summer Olympics
Boxers from Morelos
Central American and Caribbean Games bronze medalists for Mexico
Competitors at the 1990 Central American and Caribbean Games
Place of birth missing (living people)
Central American and Caribbean Games medalists in boxing
20th-century Mexican people
21st-century Mexican people